Religious discrimination is treating a person or group differently because of the particular beliefs which they hold about a religion. This includes instances when adherents of different religions, denominations or non-religions are treated unequally due to their particular beliefs, either by the law or in institutional settings, such as employment or housing.

Religious discrimination is related to religious persecution, the most extreme forms of which would include instances in which people have been executed for beliefs which have been perceived to be heretical. Laws that only carry light punishments are described as mild forms of religious persecution or religious discrimination. In recent years, the term religionism has also been used, but "religious discrimination" remains the more widely used term.

Even in societies where freedom of religion is a constitutional right, adherents of minority religions sometimes voice their concerns about religious discrimination against them. Insofar as legal policies are concerned, cases that are perceived to be cases of religious discrimination might be the result of interference in the religious sphere by other spheres of the public that are regulated by law.

History

Ancient
One of the earliest instances of religious discrimination was the forceful Hellenization of Judea by the Greek Seleucid Empire. In 167 BC, Jewish practices such as the Sabbath, Torah reading, and circumcision were banned, while pagan worship was enforced.

Jews also faced religious discrimination in the Roman Empire. The low point was the expulsion of Jews from Jerusalem and subsequent paganization of the city during the reign of Emperor Hadrian (117-138 AD), which led to the Jewish diaspora.xcv

Persecution of Christians in the Roman Empire was widespread. Christianity threatened the polytheistic order of the Roman Empire because of the importance of evangelism in Christianity. Under the Neronian persecution, Rome began to discriminate against monotheists who refused to worship the Roman gods. Nero blamed Christians for the Great Fire of Rome (64 AD). During the Decian persecution, Valerianic persecution, and Diocletianic Persecution, Christians were slaughtered by being thrown to wild beasts, churches were destroyed, priests were imprisoned, and scriptures were confiscated. 

Religious discrimination against Christians ended with the Edict of Milan (313 AD), and the Edict of Thessalonica (380 AD) made Christianity the official religion of the empire. By the 5th century Christianity became the dominant religion in Europe and took a reversed role, discriminating against pagans, heretics, and Jews.

Medieval
In the Middle Ages, antisemitism in Europe was widespread. Christians falsely accused Jews of Jewish deicide, blood libel, and well poisoning, and subjected them to expulsions, forced conversions, and mandatory sermons. In the Papal States, Jews were required to live in poor segregated neighbourhoods called ghettos. Historians note that religious discrimination against Jews tended to increase during negative economic and climatic shocks in Europe, such as when they were scapegoated for causing the Black Death.

During the Islamic Golden Age, many Jewish, Christian, Zoroastrian, and Pagan lands came under Muslim rule. As People of the Book, Jews, Christians, and Mandaeans living under Muslim rule became dhimmis with social status inferior to that of Muslims. Although Sharia law granted dhimmis freedom of religion, they were subjected to religious discrimination as second-class citizens and had to pay a jizya tax. They could not proselytize Muslims, marry Muslims (in the case of dhimmi men), build or repair churches and synagogues without permission, perform loud religious rituals such as the ringing of church bells, carry weapons, or ride horses and camels. These discriminatory laws forced many Christians into poverty and slavery.

During the First Crusade (1096), Christian knights recaptured the Holy Land from Muslim rule, massacring most of the Muslims and Jews in Jerusalem. This led to the creation of Catholic-ruled Crusader states, most notably the Kingdom of Jerusalem. In these kingdoms Jews, Muslims, and Orthodox Christians had no rights, being considered property of the crusader lords.

Modern
In early modern Europe, the Christian Church continued to be a dominant institution in Europe and enforced a strict policy of religious uniformity. In early modern Britain, there had been several Acts of Uniformity (1549-1663). Under the French king Louis XIV and his successors, Catholicism became the sole compulsory religion in early modern France, and the Huguenots had to leave the country en masse.

Towards the end of the Reconquista (711-1492), Christian kingdoms gradually reconquered the Iberian Peninsula from its Muslim rulers. During this time period, discrimination against Muslims and Jews was widespread. Examples include the Spanish Inquisition, forced conversions of Muslims in Spain, and expulsion of the Moriscos. Spanish Muslims were forced to convert to Catholicism, banned from speaking Arabic, and had their public baths destroyed.

Ever since the Fall of Constantinople (1453), many Christian lands in southeastern Europe had come under the rule of the Ottoman Empire. During the decline of the Ottoman Empire in the late modern period, particularly ever since the Great Turkish War (1683), discrimination against religious minorities worsened. The destruction of churches and expulsion of local Christian communities became increasingly common. In Ottoman Albania, the authorities abandoned tolerance policies in favor of reducing the size of Albania's Christian population through Islamization.

Antisemitism in the Russian Empire was widespread, as Imperial Russia contained the world's largest Jewish population at the time. Jews were subject to discriminatory laws such as the May Laws (1882), which restricted them from certain locations, jobs, transactions, schools, and political positions. They were also targeted in frequent anti-Jewish riots, called pogroms.

In Asia

Pakistan 

Religious discrimination in Pakistan is a serious issue. Several incidents of discrimination have been recorded with some finding support by the state itself. In a case of constitutionally sanctioned religious discrimination, non-Muslims in Pakistan cannot become Prime Minister or President, even if they are Pakistani citizens. Pakistan's Blasphemy Law, according to critics, "is overwhelmingly being used to persecute religious minorities and settle personal vendettas". Ahmadiyya Muslims have been subject to significant persecution and are sometimes declared 'non-Muslims'.

China 

Uyghurs or Uighurs are an ethnic and religious minority group in China. Their identity is based on the Islamic religion and has roots in the former East Turkistan culture. They reside in Xinjiang, an autonomous region situated in the west of the country. This group is persecuted by the Chinese government due to its perceived threat to the nation's security and identity. The Chinese government believes that the Uyghurs have separatist, extremist, and terrorist thoughts. It has detained around one million Uyghurs in camps. According to the Chinese government, these camps are created to re-educate the minority Muslims by learning about the negative consequences of extremism. Detainees are punished in these camps. The treatment of the Uyghurs violates their human rights because they are forcibly sent to the camps for an indefinite period of time. The discrimination against the Uyghurs comes in many forms. Some apparent restrictions include the ban from wearing religious veils or robes in public. The training camps serve to inculcate beliefs which are congruent with the beliefs of the Chinese Communist Party. 
Subjected to abuse and suppression in China, some Uyghurs who were seeking refuge resettled in different parts of the world. In June 2021, it was reported that the Uyghurs were being detained even outside China. Following the diplomatic relations of China with the UAE, Uyghurs living in Dubai were subjected to arrest, prolonged detention and deportation to China. China allegedly requested for the deportation of Uyghurs from three Arab countries, including the UAE. The global influence of Beijing has even resulted in the expansion of religious discrimination against the Uyghur Muslims who are residing abroad.

India 
Although the Constitution of India prohibits discrimination based on religion discrimination and religious violence in India are frequent, sometimes even involving the function of government.  For example dalit people who are not Hindu, Sikh, or Buddhist are not covered by the Scheduled Castes laws and hence dalit Christians and Muslims do not receive the affirmative action political representation and educational placement, welfare benefits, and hate crimes protections accorded to their fellows. Dalits worshipping the same gods as Hindus were previously considered to be of a different religion and in the early twentieth century the question "Is he a Hindu or Pariah?" had currency.

In the Middle East

Algeria
Leaving Islam and inciting Muslims to leave Islam is punishable by Algerian law. Prison sentences for those that practice Christianity do occur.

Egypt
Leaving Islam and inciting Muslims to leave Islam is punishable by Egyptian law.
Violence of radical Muslims against the Christian minority is common. 
Coptic Christians face many difficulties in building and renovating Coptic churches.

Iraq
Assyrian Christians have suffered from discrimination since Saddam Hussein's Arabization policies in the 1980s, with the latest instance of discrimination being the ISIS invasion of the Nineveh plains and Mosul, where tens of thousands have been forced to flee, and multiple Christian sites have been destroyed. The number of Christians in Iraq overall since the 2003 invasion has dropped by around 60%, from 800,000 to 300,000, and in 1987, that number was around 1.4 million. The 2014 invasion by ISIS has likely degraded that number further.

Morocco
Leaving Islam and inciting Muslims to leave Islam is punishable by Moroccan law. Prison sentences for those that leave Islam do occur.

Turkey
Historically, religious discrimination in Turkey has been a serious issue, with the Armenian, Greek, and Assyrian genocides all occurring there. Discrimination has continued during the Syrian Civil War. In one instance, Turkey allowed members of Al Nusra, a radical Islamic terror group that controls land in Syria, to enter through its border, and then into the majority Armenian Christian town of Kessab, which is right on the Turkish–Syrian border. Al Nusra raided the town, capturing those who didn't flee. They proceeded to take their captives to the Turkish city of Iskenderun.

In Western countries

United States

Religious discrimination in the history of the United States dates back to the first Protestant Christian European settlers, composed mostly of English Puritans, during the British colonization of North America (16th century), directed both towards Native Americans and non-Protestant Roman Catholic European settlers. (See also Colonial history of the United States).

In a 1979 consultation on the issue, the United States Commission on Civil Rights defined religious discrimination in relation to the civil rights guaranteed by the Fourteenth Amendment to the United States Constitution. Whereas religious civil liberties, such as the right to hold or not to hold a religious belief, are essential for Freedom of Religion (in the United States secured by the First Amendment), religious discrimination occurs when someone is denied "the equal protection of the laws, equality of status under the law, equal treatment in the administration of justice, and equality of opportunity and access to employment, education, housing, public services and facilities, and public accommodation because of their exercise of their right to religious freedom".

However, cases of religious discrimination might also be the result of an interference of the religious sphere with other spheres of the public that are regulated by law. Although e.g. in the United States the Free Exercise Clause of the First Amendment states that "Congress shall make no law respecting an establishment of religion, or prohibiting the free exercise thereof", in Reynolds v. United States the U.S. Supreme Court decided that religious duty was not a suitable defense to a criminal indictment. In this specific case a law against bigamy was not considered to be discriminating against Mormons, who stopped practicing polygamy in 1890.

Canada
In Canada, during 1995-1998, Newfoundland had only Christian schools (four of them, Pentecostal, Roman Catholic, Seventh-day Adventist, and inter-denominational (Anglican, Salvation Army and United Church)). The right to organize publicly supported religious schools was only given to certain Christian denominations, thus tax money used to support a selected group of Christian denominations. The denominational schools could also refuse admission of a student or the hiring of a qualified teacher on purely religious grounds. Quebec has used two school systems, one Protestant and the other Roman Catholic, but it seems this system will be replaced with two secular school systems: one French and the other English.

Ontario had two school systems going back before Confederation. The British North America Act (1867) gave the Provinces jurisdiction over education. Section 93 of the BNA Act offered constitutional protection for denominational schools as they existed in law at the time of Confederation. Like "Public schools", Catholic schools are fully funded from kindergarten to grade 12. However, profound demographic changes of the past few decades have made the province of Ontario a multicultural, multi-racial, and multi-religious society. The thought that one religious group is privileged to have schools funded from the public purse is often considered unacceptable in a pluralistic, multicultural, secular society.  Although it's also true that the people who send their children to those schools have a form that directs their tax dollars to that school system.

Canadian faith-based university Trinity Western University (TWU) is currently facing a challenge from members of the legal and LGBT community to its freedom to educate students in a private university context while holding certain "religious values", such as the freedom to discriminate against other people, including requiring students to sign a chastity oath, and denying LGBT students the same rights as straight students.  TWU faced a similar battle in 2001 (Trinity Western University v. British Columbia College of Teachers) where the Supreme Court of Canada ruled that TWU was capable to teach professional disciplines.

On June 16, 2019, Quebec banned public servants in positions of authority from wearing visible religious symbols. The legislation was erected with the goal of promoting neutrality. Prime Minister Trudeau argues that the ban goes against fundamental rights of Canadian people.

Germany

Scientologists in Germany face specific political and economic restrictions. They are barred from membership in some major political parties, and businesses and other employers use so-called "sect filters" to expose a prospective business partner's or employee's association with the organization. German federal and state interior ministers started a process aimed at banning Scientology in late 2007, but abandoned the initiative a year later, finding insufficient legal grounds. Despite this, polls suggest that most Germans favor banning Scientology altogether. The U.S. government has repeatedly raised concerns over discriminatory practices directed at individual Scientologists.

Greece
In Greece since the independence from the Muslim Ottomans rule in the 19th century, the Greek Orthodox Church has been given privileged status and only the Greek Orthodox church, Roman Catholic, some Protestant churches, Judaism and Islam are recognized religions. The Muslim minority alleges that Greece persistently and systematically discriminates against Muslims.

Recently, professor Nick Drydakis (Anglia Ruskin University) examined religious affiliation and employment bias in Athens, by implementing an experimental field study. Labor market outcomes (occupation access, entry wage, and wait time for call back) were assessed for three religious minorities (Pentecostal, evangelical, and Jehovah's Witnesses). Results indicate that religious minorities experience employment bias. Moreover, religious minorities face greater constraints on occupational access in more prestigious jobs compared to less prestigious jobs. Occupational access and entry wage bias is highest for religious minority women. In all cases, Jehovah's Witnesses face the greatest bias; female employers offered significantly lower entry wages to Jehovah's Witnesses than male employers.

Mexico
According to a Human Rights Practices report by the U.S. State department on Mexico note that "some local officials infringe on religious freedom, especially in the south". There is conflict between Catholic/Mayan syncretists and Protestant evangelicals in the Chiapas region.

See also

Antireligion
Antisemitism
Antitheism
Civil and political rights
Discrimination against atheists
Forced conversion
Intersectionality
Islamic religious police
Islamophobia
List of anti-discrimination acts
Out Campaign
Persecution of Christians
Persecution of Christians in the post–Cold War era
Persecution of Jews
Persecution of Muslims
Religious intolerance
Religious persecution
Religious segregation
Religious violence
Secularization
State atheism
State religion

Notes

References 
 Stokes, DaShanne. (In Press) Legalized Segregation and the Denial of Religious Freedom 
 Stokes, DaShanne. (2001). "Sage, Sweetgrass, and the First Amendment." The Chronicle of Higher Education. May 18, 2001, sec. 2: B16.
 U.S. Commission on Civil Rights, 1979: Religious discrimination. A neglected issue. A consultation sponsored by the United States Commission on Civil Rights, Washington D.C., April 9–10, 1979